Shestakove (until 1968 Nepokryte (Непокрите)) is a village in Chuhuiv Raion (district) in Kharkiv Oblast of eastern Ukraine, at about  east-northeast  from the centre of Kharkiv city.

The village came under attack by Russian forces in May 2022, during the Russian invasion of Ukraine.

References

Villages in Chuhuiv Raion
Kharkovsky Uyezd